Kapelos is a surname. Notable people with the surname include:

John Kapelos (born 1956), Canadian actor
Vassy Kapelos (born 1981), Canadian political journalist